Aquad is a free computer-assisted qualitative data analysis software (CAQDAS) that supports content analysis of open data in qualitative research in psychology, education, sociology, philosophy, medicine, ethnography, politics, etc. Open data is collected through observation, introspection, narratives, discussion groups, interviews, etc.

Author
Aquad was developed.

Description
Aquad provides classical tools of content analysis as:
 Text searching: looking for segments in texts.
 Coding: labeling segments in texts, audios, photos, or videos.
 Writing memos (annotation): inserting annotations linked to parts or whole texts, audios, photos, or videos.
 Word analysis: counting words according to criteria.
 Retrieving by file name, code, keyword, or parts of memo texts: Retrieving segments according to criteria.
 Table analysis: constructing tables combining criteria and arranging data in rows and columns.
 Construction of linkage hypotheses: looking for relationships among codes.
 Comparison of cases/files: contrasting coding among files.
 Sequential analysis: part of the objective hermeneutics approach.
 Comparison of cases by Boolean analysis: critical features and identification of „types“ as introduced by Charles Ragin.
 Export data: quantitative softwares as R, SPSS, and PSPP for statistical analysis.

Possibilities

Presentation of data
Data could be analysed as written text, audio, photo, or video. Initially, the Computer assisted qualitative data analysis software analysed only verbal texts. The observation, introspection, narratives, discussion groups, interviews, etc. were transcribed and CAQDAS only analysed the transcription (linguistics).

Situation of data
Data could be directly analysed on the screen (one-step) or outside (two-steps). One-step allows to code on the screen with digitalised data. Two-steps allows to enter codes on the screen keeping the documents as realia on the desk or in other means as cameras, TV, etc. For instance, two-steps allows the analysis of recordings, diaries, incunabula, or objects without transcribing, taking photos, or scanning them.

Comparison of cases/files by Boolean analysis
Aquad allows comparison of cases/files by "logical minimization". It applies the Boolean method of qualitative comparison by Ragin (1989) and detects critical features to identify types of cases.

Versions
The current available version is 8, this includes examples of analysis in written text, audio, photo, and video. Aquad is available in German, English, and Spanish.

See also
Case study
Qualitative economics
Qualitative marketing research
Qualitative psychological research
Qualitative research

References
 Huber, G. L. & Gürtler, L. (2013) AQUAD 7. Manual: The Analysis of Qualitative data. Tübingen: Ingeborg Huber Verlag. Download 
 Ragin, C. C. (1989) The Comparative Method: Moving Beyond Qualitative and Quantitative Strategies. Berkeley and Los Angeles: University of California Press. Google Books

External links 
 
 Official manual 
 Spanish Association for the Advance of Qualitative Research (2018). AQUAD 7: programa análisis de datos de acceso abierto. Asociación Española para el Avance de la Investigación Cualitativa.
 Feliz Murias, T. (2012). Análisis de contenido de la comunicación asíncrona en la formación universitaria (Content analysis of asynchronous communication in the university training).Revista de Educación, 358, Mayo-agosto 2012, pp. 282-309.
 Gil Flores, J. (Director) (2007). El tratamiento de datos en investigación cualitativa con AQUAD (Data processing in qualitative research). Universidad de Sevilla.
 López Regalado, O. (2008). Tutorial of Aquad 6.
 Ricoy Lorenzo, M.C., Sevillano García, M.L. & Feliz Murias, T. (2011). Competencias necesarias para la utilización de las principales herramientas de Internet en la educación (Competences Needed to Use the Main Internet Tools in Education). Revista de Educación, 356. Septiembre-diciembre 2011, pp. 483-507.

Qualitative research
Free QDA software